Tayakadın is a village in central district (Edirne) of Edirne Province, Turkey. The population of Tayakadın  was 1574  as of 2013. The village was founded in the 20th century in place of a former stud farm. The name of the village refers to a woman; either the owner of the former farm (an Italian woman) or the wet nurse of Ottoman sultan Mehmet II. Main crops of the village are cereal, sun flower canola and rice. The village also hosts a small industrial area.

References

Villages in Edirne District